Comptes Rendus (proceedings) may refer to several academic journals or conference proceedings
 Comptes rendus de l'Académie d'Agriculture de France
Comptes rendus de l'Académie bulgare des sciences
Comptes rendus des séances de l'Académie des inscriptions et belles-lettres, is an academic journal of history, philology, and archeology published by the Académie des Inscriptions et Belles-Lettres
Comptes rendus de l'Académie des sciences de Paris, a French scientific journal which has been published since 1666 by the Académie des Sciences. Several subsections exist.
 Comptes rendus de l'Académie des sciences de Roumanie
Comptes rendus de l'Académie des sciences de l'URSS, the French version of the Proceedings of the USSR Academy of Sciences
Comptes rendus des travaux du Laboratoire Carlsberg
Comptes rendus de la Société de biologie, also known as Comptes rendus et mémoires de la Société de biologie and Comptes rendus de la Société de biologie et des ses filiales
Comptes rendus des séances de la Société entomologique de Belgique
Comptes rendus de la Societé française de gynécologie
Comptes rendus des séances de la Société des sciences et des lettres de Varsovie
It may also refer to
Compte rendu, a document published in February 1781 presenting the state of France's finances